Zitha torridalis is a species of snout moth. It is found in Korea, Japan, China, India, Sri Lanka, Myanmar and Java.

The wingspan is 17–23 mm. The ground colour of the forewings is pale grayish brown. Adults are on wing from July to August.

References

Moths described in 1863
Pyralini
Moths of Japan